The Yugoslavia national football team represented Yugoslavia in international association football.

Although the team mainly represented the pre-war Kingdom of Yugoslavia and the post-war SFR Yugoslavia, various iterations of the state were formally constituted in football, including the:
 Kingdom of Serbs, Croats and Slovenes (1918–1929)
 Kingdom of Yugoslavia (1929–1945)
 Democratic Federal Yugoslavia (1945)
 Federal People's Republic of Yugoslavia (1945–1963)
 Socialist Federal Republic of Yugoslavia (1963–1992)

It enjoyed success in international competition, reaching semifinal at the 1930 and 1962 FIFA World Cups. In 1992, during the Yugoslav wars, the team was suspended from international competition as part of the United Nations sanctions on Yugoslavia.

History

The first national team was in the kingdom that existed between the two world wars. The Football Federation of what was then the Kingdom of Serbs, Croats and Slovenes was founded in Zagreb in 1919 under the name Jugoslavenski nogometni savez (and admitted into FIFA), and the national team played its first international game at the Summer Olympics in Antwerp in 1920. The opponent was Czechoslovakia, and the historic starting eleven that represented Kingdom of SCS on its debut were: Dragutin Vrđuka, Vjekoslav Župančić, Jaroslav Šifer, Stanko Tavčar, Slavin Cindrić, Rudolf Rupec, Dragutin Vragović, Artur Dubravčić, Emil Perška, Ivan Granec, and Jovan Ružić. They lost by a huge margin 0–7, but nonetheless got their names in the history books.

1930 World Cup

In 1929, the country was renamed to Yugoslavia and the football association became Fudbalski savez Jugoslavije and ordered to move its headquarters from Zagreb to Belgrade. The national team participated at the 1930 FIFA World Cup, finishing in fourth place. In its first ever World Cup match in Montevideo's Parque Central, Yugoslavia managed a famous 2–1 win versus mighty Brazil, with the following starting eleven representing the country: Milovan Jakšić, Branislav Sekulić, Aleksandar Tirnanić, Milutin Ivković, Ivica Bek, Momčilo Đokić, Blagoje Marjanović, Milorad Arsenijević, Đorđe Vujadinović, Dragoslav Mihajlović, and Ljubiša Stefanović. The team was the youngest squad at the inaugural World Cup at an average age of just under 22 years old, and became quite popular amongst the Uruguayan public, who dubbed them "Los Ichachos". The national team consisted of players based in Serbian football clubs, while the Zagreb Subassociation forbid players from Croatian clubs, some of whom were regulars in the national team until then, to play in the World Cup due to the relocation of football association's headquarters from Zagreb to Belgrade.

Post-World War II period
The federation and football overall was disrupted by World War II. After the war, a socialist federation was formed and the football federation reconstituted. It was one of the founding members of the UEFA in 1954.

Silver Medal at 1948 Summer Olympics
Yugoslavia began their football campaign by defeating Luxembourg 6–1, with five different players scoring the goals. In the quarter-finals and the semi-finals, they would take out Turkey and Great Britain by the same score of 3–1. In the final though, they would lose to Sweden.

Silver Medal at 1952 Summer Olympics
Having a team with many players from the 1948 generation, Yugoslavia was a formidable side at the 1952 Summer Olympics and finished as runners-up behind the famous "Golden Team" representing Hungary. Against the USSR, Yugoslavia was 5–1 up with 15 minutes of their first round match to go. The Yugoslavs, understandably, put their feet up. Arthur Ellis, the match referee, recorded what happened next in his book, The Final Whistle (London, 1963): "The USSR forced the most honourable draw ever recorded! [Vsevolod] Bobrov, their captain, scored a magnificent hat-trick. After the USSR had reduced the lead to 5–2, he, almost single-handed, took the score to 5–5, scoring his third in the last minute. For once, use of the word sensational was justified." Although Bobrov's early goal in their replay presaged a miraculous recovery, Yugoslavia recovered sufficiently to put out their opponents easily in the second half.

Later decades
In 1976, Yugoslavia organized the European Championship played in Belgrade and Zagreb. The national team participated in eight World Cups and four Euros, won the Olympic football tournament in 1960 at the Summer Games (they also finished second three times and third once), and developed a reputation for skillful and attacking football, leading them to be dubbed "the Brazilians of Europe".

Dragan Džajić holds the record for the most national team caps at 85, between 1964 and 1979. The best scorer is Stjepan Bobek with 38 goals, between 1946 and 1956.

Dissolution and UN embargo
With the end of the Cold War, democratic principles were introduced to the country which brought about the end of Titoist rule. In the subsequent atmosphere, national tensions were heightened. At the Yugoslavia-Netherlands friendly in preparation for the 1990 World Cup, the Croatian crowd in Zagreb jeered the Yugoslav team and anthem and waved Dutch flags (owing to its resemblance to the Croatian tricolour). With the dissolution of Yugoslavia, the team split up and the remaining team of the Federal Republic of Yugoslavia (FRY) was banned from competing at Euro 92. The decision was made on 31 May 1992, just 10 days before the competition commenced. They had finished top of their qualifying group, but were unable to play in the competition due to United Nations Security Council Resolution 757. Their place was taken by Denmark, who went on to win the competition.

After the breakup of Yugoslavia, the FRY consisted of Montenegro and Serbia.

In 1992, Yugoslavia had also been drawn as second seed in Group 5 of the European Zone in the qualifying tournament for the 1994 World Cup. FRY was barred from competing, rendering the group unusually weak.

In 1994, when the boycott was lifted, the union of Serbia and Montenegro competed under the name "Yugoslavia", as the Federal Republic of Yugoslavia national football team.

The Serbia national football team inherited Yugoslavia's spot within FIFA and UEFA and is considered by both organisations as the only successor of Yugoslavia (and of Serbia and Montenegro).

The national team of Serbia and Montenegro continued under the name Yugoslavia until 2003, when country and team were renamed Serbia and Montenegro.

Youth teams
The under-21 team won the inaugural UEFA U-21 Championship in 1978.

The Yugoslav under-20 team won the FIFA World Youth Championship 1987.

Kits

Competitive record

FIFA World Cup record

 Champions   Runners-up   Third Place   Fourth Place

UEFA European Championship record

 Champions   Runners-up   Third Place   Fourth Place  

*Denotes draws including knockout matches decided on penalty kicks.

Mediterranean Games 
Yugoslavia Olympic football team

Honours 

FIFA World Cup 
 Fourth place (2): 1930, 1962

UEFA European Championship
 Runner-up (2): 1960, 1968
 Fourth place (1): 1976

Olympic football tournament
 Gold Medal (1): 1960
 Silver Medal (3): 1948, 1952, 1956
 Bronze Medal (1): 1984

Balkan Cup
 Winner (2): 1934–35, 1935
 Runner-up (6): 1929–31, 1932, 1933, 1946, 1947, 1977–80

Player statistics

Most capped players

Top goalscorers

Notable players 
Goalkeepers

Defenders

Midfielders

Forwards

Head-to-head record

Head coaches

See also
 List of Yugoslavia international footballers
 List of Yugoslavia national football team goalscorers
 Yugoslavia national football team results (1920–41)
 Yugoslavia national football team results (1946–69)
 Yugoslavia national football team results (1970–92)
 Yugoslavia national under-21 football team
 Yugoslavia national under-20 football team

Teams from successor states
 Bosnia and Herzegovina national football team (member of UEFA and FIFA since 1990s)
 Croatia national football team (member of UEFA and FIFA since 1990s)
 Slovenia national football team (member of UEFA and FIFA since 1990s)
 North Macedonia national football team (member of UEFA and FIFA since 1990s)
 Serbia and Montenegro national football team (considered successor of Yugoslavia by UEFA and FIFA), later:
 Montenegro national football team (member of UEFA and FIFA since 2006)
 Serbia national football team (considered successor of Serbia and Montenegro, as Serbia since 2008)
 Kosovo national football team (member of UEFA and FIFA since 2016)

Notes

References

Bibliography

External links

 RSSSF – Yugoslavia men's national football team international matches 1920–1992 
 RSSSF – Yugoslavia men's national football team international matches + Serbia and Montenegro and Serbia 
Yugoslavia national football team web page 

 
Former national association football teams in Europe
1920 establishments in Yugoslavia
Football in Yugoslavia
National sports teams established in 1920